Rachana Inder is an Indian actress who works mainly in Kannada film industry. She debuted as a supporting actress in the film Love Mocktail.

Filmography

References

External links
 
 
 

Actresses in Kannada cinema
Living people
Actresses from Bangalore
Year of birth missing (living people)